Year 940 (CMXL) was a leap year starting on Wednesday (link will display the full calendar) of the Julian calendar.

Events 
 By place 

 Europe 
 The tribe of the Polans begins the construction of the following fortified settlements (Giecz, Bnin, Ląd, Gniezno, Poznań, Grzybowo and Ostrów Lednicki) in Greater Poland. The Piast Dynasty under Duke Siemomysł gains control over other groups of Polans along the Upper Vistula, and establishes their rule around Giecz (approximate date).

 Japan 
 March 25 – Taira no Masakado, the self-proclaimed "New Emperor" (新皇), is subdued by local rivals who revolt against his rule. His forces are defeated by his cousin, Taira no Sadamori, in Shimōsa Province. Masakado's head is brought back to Emperor Suzaku in Tokyo.

 By topic 
 Literature 
 Saadia Gaon, a Jewish rabbi and philosopher, compiles his Siddur (Jewish prayer book) in Arabic and synagogal poetry in modern-day Iraq (approximate date).

 Religion 
Narita-san ("New victory temple"), a Shingon Buddhist temple, is founded in Chiba (Japan).

Births 
 June 10 – Abu al-Wafa' Buzjani, Persian mathematician and astronomer (d. 998)
 Abdollah ibn Bukhtishu, Syrian physician and scientist (d. 1058)
 Abu-Mahmud Khojandi, Persian astronomer and mathematician (d. 1000)
 Abū Sahl al-Qūhī, Persian mathematician and physicist (approximate date)
 Adelaide-Blanche of Anjou, French queen and regent (d. 1026)
 Al-Baqillani, Muslim theologian and jurist (approximate date)
 Baldwin III ("the Young"), Frankish nobleman (approximate date)
 Chavundaraya, Indian general, architect and poet (d. 989)
 Damian Dalassenos, Byzantine governor (approximate date)
 Eadwig ("the All-Fair"), king of England (approximate date)
 Ferdowsi, Persian poet and author (approximate date)
 George El Mozahem, Egyptian martyr and saint (d. 969)
 Géza, Grand Prince of the Hungarians (approximate date)
 Guy (or Guido), margrave of Ivrea (Piedmont) (d. 965)
 Henry III ("the Younger"), duke of Bavaria (approximate date)
 Leopold I, margrave of Austria (approximate date)
 Lothair I, margrave of the Nordmark (approximate date)
 Notker of Liège, French bishop and prince-bishop (d. 1008)
 Subh of Córdoba, mother and regent of Hisham II (approximate date)
 Thorgeir Ljosvetningagodi, Icelandic lawspeaker (approximate date)
 Vijayanandi, Indian mathematician and astronomer (approximate date)
 Willigis, German archchancellor and archbishop (approximate date)
 Wulfhilda of Barking, English nun and abbess (approximate date)

Deaths 
 March 25 – Taira no Masakado, Japanese nobleman and samurai
 May 12 – Eutychius, patriarch of Alexandria (b. 877)
 June 7 – Qian Hongzun, heir apparent of Wuyue (b. 925)
 July 4 – Wang Jianli, Chinese general (b. 871)
 July 20 – Ibn Muqla, Abbasid vizier and calligrapher
 August 5 – Li Decheng, Chinese general (b. 863)
 September 30 – Fan Yanguang, Chinese general
 November 8 – Yao Yi, Chinese chancellor (b. 866)
 November 14 – Abu'l-Fadl al-Bal'ami, Samanid vizier
 December 23 – Ar-Radi, Abbasid caliph (b. 909)
 December 25 – Makan ibn Kaki, Daylamite warlord
 Atenulf II, prince of Benevento and Capua (Italy)
 Faelan mac Muiredach, king of Leinster (Ireland)
 Ibn Abd Rabbih, Moorish writer and poet (b. 860)
 Rajyapala, emperor of the Pala Dynasty (Bengal)
 Yang Lian, crown prince of Wu (Ten Kingdoms)
 Zhao Guangyi, Chinese official and chancellor

References